Cernay-lès-Reims (literally Cernay near Reims) is a commune in the Marne department in north-eastern France.

Cernay-lès-Reims, along with the neighboring commune of Berru, is notable in the literature of paleontology as the site of a geologic formation (part of the Paris Basin) that has yielded a significant number of Paleocene-strata fossils.

See also
Communes of the Marne department

References

Cernaylesreims